The  International Union of Forest Research Organizations (IUFRO) is a non-profit, non-governmental international network of forest scientists, headquartered in Austria.The aim of the organization is to promote worldwide cooperation in scientific studies embracing the whole field of research related to forests and their use and sustainable development. In 2019 IUFRO counted 630 Member Organizations worldwide.

Activities 

IUFRO generates scientific knowledge for policy-makers, practitioners and stakeholders; and assists scientists and institutions to strengthen their research capacity. All activities are based on voluntary contributions from scientists.

Congresses and conferences
Every five years, IUFRO organizes a World Congress with about 2000 participants. The most recent was in Curitiba, Brazil, in 2019. Between World Congresses, there are some 70-80 smaller conferences, meetings and webinars organized each year by the individual IUFRO research units (i.e. Divisions, Research Groups and Working Parties, Task Forces, Special Programmes, Projects and Chapters) all over the world.

Involvement in international processes 
Many joint activities and partnership agreements occur with national governments, regional and global organizations and NGOs. For example, IUFRO is a Scientific Union Member of the International Council for Science (ICSU), a member of the Collaborative Partnership on Forests (CPF), and an observer organization in the United Nations Forum on Forests, the Convention on Biological Diversity, the UN Framework Convention on Climate Change and other forest-related international processes and conventions. It has established memoranda of understanding with, for instance, the Food and Agriculture Organization of the United Nations (FAO), World Conservation Union (IUCN), the World Wide Fund for Nature (WWF), the International Tropical Timber Organization (ITTO), and International Forestry Students' Association (IFSA).

Communication and knowledge sharing
IUFRO shares scientific knowledge and information with its members and stakeholders via its website iufro.org, the expertise of its officeholders, publications such as IUFRO News, IUFRO Spotlight, calendar of events, webinars, information leaflets, annual reports, Occasional Papers, IUFRO World Series, IUFRO Research Series, and conference proceedings. In 2011, a Working Party on Communications and Public Relations was established as part of IUFRO Division 9 on Forest Policy and Economics.

Honors and awards 
IUFRO honors through a variety of awards those who advance science and promote international cooperation in all fields of research related to forestry. Awards for scientific work include:

 Scientific Achievement Award (SAA)
 Outstanding Doctoral Research Award (ODRA)
 IUFRO Student Award for Excellence in Forest Science (ISA)
 IUFRO World Congress Host Scientific Award
 Best Poster Award (BPA)

Organization 
The Organs of the Union are: Congress; International Council; Board and Committees; Management Committee; President (Dr John Parrotta) and Vice-Presidents; Executive Director. The structure of the Union comprises the following IUFRO Units: Divisions with Research Groups and Working Parties; Task Forces, Special Programmes, Projects, IUFRO-led Initiatives and (formerly) Chapters.

Divisions, task forces and programmes
At present there are nine permanent Divisions, sub-divided into Research Groups and Working Parties  

 Silviculture
Physiology and Genetics
 Forest Operations  Engineering and Management
 Forest Assessment, Modelling and Management
 Forest Products 
 Social  Aspects of Forests and Forestry
 Forest Health
 Forest Environment
 Forest Policy and Economics.
IUFRO Task Forces are interdisciplinary and are established on a temporary basis. The following Task Forces were approved in 2019:

 Forest Education
 Monitoring Global Tree Mortality Patterns and Trends
  Fire$: Economic Drivers of Global Wildland Fire Activity
  Forests and Water Interactions in a Changing Environment
 Gender Equality in Forestry
 Resilient Planted Forests Serving Society & Bioeconomy
 Strengthening Mediterranean Nursery Systems for Forest Reproductive Material Procurement to Adapt to the Effects of Climate Change
 Unlocking the Bioeconomy and Non-Timber Forest Products
 Transforming Forest Landscapes for Futures Climates and Human Well-Being

The Special Programme for Development of Capacities (IUFRO-SPDC) was established as ‘Special Programme for Developing Countries’ in 1983 at the request of the international donor community following a declaration of the XVII IUFRO World Congress in Kyoto, Japan in 1981. The declaration aimed to increase international support for the development of forestry research in less developed countries. SPDC aims to enhance the ability of research institutions to generate and deliver scientific information and offers advisory services on forest and trees and their sustainable utilization through training of scientists, collaborative research and thematic networking, scientist assistance program. The activities of SPDC include training workshops, scientist assistance and mobility programs as well as thematic networking especially in the field of forest and landscape restoration.

The Global Forest Expert Panels (GFEP) were launched in April 2007, as a joint initiative of the Collaborative Partnership on Forests (CPF). Since then, the initiative has been led and coordinated by IUFRO. It builds on the political recognition provided by the United Nations Forum on Forests in the ECOSOC Resolution 2006/49. GFEP started as "Joint CPF initiative on Forest Science and Technology" and was later renamed. GFEP mainly produces interdisciplinary scientific assessment reports on key issues emerging from international policy debates. The reports are prepared by thematic Global Forest Expert Panels of scientific experts in their fields. 

The Special Project World Forests, Society and Environment (IUFRO-WFSE) is coordinated by the Natural Resources Institute Finland (Luke). It is a global, open, collaborative network of scientists and experts from different parts of the world. WFSE focuses on topics recognised by the scientific community as important and having significant policy implications but appear not to be receiving adequate attention from the policy community. WFSE produces and disseminates scientific publications, policy and information briefs, and capacity-building materials. 

The Global Forest Information Service (GFIS) is an internet gateway that allows sharing of forest-related information through a single entry point. These resources are freely searchable online and provide direct access to the original information. 

The SilvaVoc Terminology Project emphasizes the importance of the correct usage of technical terms in forestry, and is the name of IUFRO's clearinghouse for multilingual forest terminology. It offers glossaries on specific topics and has built Silvaterm, a terminological database for forestry.

History 

Forests have always been an important for economic development and environmental maintenance. In 1890 the International Agriculture and Forestry Congress in Vienna, Austria, proposed to establish a "central organ" for applied forest research in the European countries. As a consequence, the “International Union of Forest Experiment Organizations” was founded in Eberswalde, Germany, in 1892. Originally, only Austria, Germany and Switzerland agreed that their forest experiment stations would join the Union. By the beginning of World War I, stations from 22 countries, including USA, Canada and Japan, had become members.

During World War I international cooperation stopped, as did forest research in many of the countries involved in the war. The Union only fully resumed its activities in 1929 when the new name “International Union of Forestry Research Organizations” was adopted. In the years to follow, the organization lost its Central European character as more representatives from Africa, Asia and the Americas joined. 

World War II reduced the activities of the Union to a minimum. Cooperation continued only between individuals, and not on an institutional basis. In 1949 the newly established Food and Agriculture Organization of the United Nations (FAO) declared its readiness to make available to IUFRO a secretariat at FAO’s own Headquarters in Rome.

IUFRO has played an essential role in establishing standards and harmonizing field investigations in forest research. In 1903 the Union initiated international forestry bibliographies that did not exist earlier. Gradually the development led to the well-known Oxford System of Decimal Classification (ODe) for Forestry in the 1950s

The 1950s and 1960s were a period of steady growth. The XV IUFRO World Congress in Gainesville, USA, in 1971 was the first Congress held outside Europe. For the first time, it was referred to as a “World Congress,” and a Congress title was introduced: “The Role of Research in the Intensification of Forestry Practices and Activities.”

In the 1980s, IUFRO started to increasingly address forest-related social, economic, and ecological problems of global importance. The XVIII World Congress held in Ljubljana, Yugoslavia, in 1986 was the first to take place in Eastern Europe.  

Since the 1990s the focus of the community of forest policymakers, economists and managers has changed. This is as societal expectations regarding forests broadened to include enhanced production of forest goods, social benefits, and environmental services through sustainable management of trees and forests. IUFRO responded to these challenges by adapting its scientific structure, expanding strategic partnerships and engaging more at the science/policy interface. 

The XXI IUFRO World Congress in Kuala Lumpur, Malaysia, in 2000 was the first IUFRO World Congress to be held in a developing country. In 2000 the name of the Union was changed once more into “International Union of Forest Research Organizations”. The year 2000 also marked the first time in IUFRO´s history that gender issues were formally addressed. Over the last ten years, IUFRO undertook efforts to expand the scope of work beyond ‘traditional’ sectoral and disciplinary boundaries. At the 125th Anniversary Congress in 2017 in Freiburg, Germany, the slogan “Interconnecting Forests, Science and People” was adopted as part of the logo.

Presidents 

 2020 - John Parrotta
 2014 - 2019 Mike Wingfield

See also 
International Day of Forests

References

External links 
 IUFRO Official Website
 GFIS

Members of the International Council for Science
International forestry organizations
International organisations based in Austria
Scientific organisations based in Austria
Members of the International Science Council